Sean Power is a former inter-county hurler for Dublin, a Commercials hurling club captain and a former player with St Mary's GFC in Saggart.

Power made his debut for Dublin against Galway in the 1992 National Hurling League, with his Championship debut following against Wexford in 1993. His final game for Dublin was a 2001 Leinster Senior Hurling Championship match. He started his Dublin career as a half-back but reverted to full-back for the majority of his intercounty career. He was also captain during the 1999 and 2000 seasons.

Power won a Division 2 National League medal with Dublin in 1997, played with Leinster in 1996, 1997 and 1998, winning a Railway Cup medal in 1998. With Commercials he won Under 21, Intermediate and Senior B Championships and a Junior football championship with St Mary's. He also represented Ireland against Scotland in the composite rules shinty-hurling games in 1995 and 1998. After retiring he started coaching with various Dublin underage teams and was U20 manager for the 2021 & 2022 seasons.

References

‘We didn’t produce our best on the day’ – Dublin South Schools manager Seán Power after Leinster final loss
Sean Power 1985 – 1990 HFCS
Dublin U20s hurling manager Seán Power speaks to DubsTV after win over Offaly

Year of birth missing (living people)
Living people
Dublin inter-county hurlers
Ireland international hurlers
Sportspeople from Dublin (city)
St Mary's (Dublin) hurlers